The Little Madawaska River is a  river in northern Maine.

See also
List of rivers of Maine

References

Maine Streamflow Data from the USGS
Maine Watershed Data From Environmental Protection Agency

Rivers of Maine
Geography of Aroostook County, Maine